Casimiro de Abreu (formerly known as Barra de São João ) is a municipality located in the Brazilian state of Rio de Janeiro. Its population was 45,041 (2020) and its area is 461 km².

The city was called Indaiaçu until it was rebaptized in 1925 to homage the poet Casimiro de Abreu, who was born in their coastal district Barra de São João.

The municipality contains part of the Central Rio de Janeiro Atlantic Forest Mosaic, created in 2006.
It holds part of the União Biological Reserve, home to a population of endangered golden lion tamarin.
It contains  of the  Macaé de Cima Environmental Protection Area, created in 2001.

References

Populated coastal places in Rio de Janeiro (state)
Municipalities in Rio de Janeiro (state)